Ernest Walter Cant (1890 – 1982) was a British communist activist.

Born in Stoke Newington, Cant joined the Young Socialist League at the age of fifteen, and immediately became involved with the successful campaign against wage reductions at the Thames Iron Works.  He was appointed as the organiser of the Young Socialist League in 1912, and then as the London organiser of its parent group, the British Socialist Party (BSP) in 1914.  He was part of the majority opposing British involvement in World War I, and wrote extensively in the party newspaper, The Call.

Due to his opposition to the war, Cant registered as a conscientious objector and was imprisoned in 1917.  Two years later, with the war over, he commenced a hunger strike in protest at his continued incarceration, and was soon released.  He was then appointed as the BSP's Scottish organiser, and in this role took part in the discussions which formed the Communist Party of Great Britain (CPGB).  The party appointed him as its first London District Organiser, although he left the position in mid-1925.

Later in 1925, Cant was one of twelve leading figures in the CPGB arrested on a charge of sedition and was imprisoned for six months.  On release, he relocated to South Wales, where he spoke in support of miners during their lock-out, then moved to the Soviet Union, working for the International Class War Prisoners Aid Movement and the Comintern.

From the early 1930s, Cant was the CPGB organiser in Nottingham, where he attempted to build support among miners, and was also active in the local co-operative movement.  He was sacked from his CPGB post, but party leader Harry Pollitt intervened to help him find work with the Russian Oil Products company, and he remained a CPGB member until his death in 1982.

References

1890 births
1982 deaths
British Socialist Party members
Communist Party of Great Britain members
People from Stoke Newington